Quatsino is a small hamlet of 91 people located on Quatsino Sound in Northern Vancouver Island, Canada only accessible by boat or float plane. Its nearest neighbour is Coal Harbour, to the east, about 20 minutes away by boat, and Port Alice, to the south, about 40 minutes away by boat. The largest town in the region, Port Hardy, is located about an hour northeast by boat and motor vehicle.

Description
The village is known to have one of British Columbia's only still-used public one-room schoolhouses, a two-story wooden building built in 1935. The oldest building on the North Island is also located in Quatsino, a woodland chapel called St. Olaf's Anglican Church, a popular site for weddings. It was built in 1897. Quatsino was originally settled by Norwegian farmers from North Dakota who arrived via steamship in 1894 to homestead and farm thirty  lots offered free through Crown Grants- publicized at the Chicago World Exposition of 1893. Soon freight service to Victoria was established, along with a post office and customs office and a government wharf. The area grew as resources were developed and the area boasted numerous mines, canneries, general stores, rental cabins, a hotel, a saloon, telegraph office and an Imperial Oil fuel station. The village was a thriving community up until the 1940s. The post office is still in operation and two cemeteries mark the history of the community.

High speed internet via satellite arrived in the mid-spring of 2007, replacing slow speed dial up in most of the community. The new destination for visitors to the area is the Quatsino Museum, which opened in the summer of 2007.

Tourism
Since 2003, Quatsino has become an increasingly popular destination for sports fishing, kayaking, bird watching and whale watching. There are numerous sports fishing lodges that have opened as a result.

Featured in media
Alone, an American reality television series, was filmed on Vancouver Island in Quatsino Territory for its first, second and fourth seasons, shot between 2015-2017.

Caiette, a setting in the novel The Glass Hotel, was based on Quatsino.

Climate
Quatsino has a rainy oceanic climate (Köppen Cfb) with cool and generally very rainy winters and mild, somewhat drier (though much wetter than Vancouver or eastern island communities) summers. Cold outbreaks that produce cold and dry winter weather over coastal communities are less effective over Vancouver Island.

References

The Quatsino Chronicle by Gwen Hansen
Norwegians in the Northwest by Eric Faa
History of Quatsino Colony by George Nordstrom
Dreams of Freedom by Gordon Fish

Designated places in British Columbia
Unincorporated settlements in British Columbia
Norwegian Canadian settlements
Populated places in the Regional District of Mount Waddington
Quatsino Sound region